Safterei, a private corporation, is a German-based company producing cold-pressed vegetable juices.

History 
Safterei was founded by Timo Krämer and Tarek Mandelartz, two students, in spring of 2014. They started their business in Berlin, which focused at first on a detox line. The first juice recipes were developed at home in their kitchen. Juices were sold directly form their home's door. Consumers would substitute all their food intake for the day with 9 Safterei juices, also known as juice fasting. 
Soon after, they started a normal consumers line offering bottled juices to consumers. They applied to different communities and gave multiple presentations to reach a larger audience. The production has been moved and increased a lot. The juices can now be found in cafés, hotels, bakeries, vegan shops as well as in the supermarkets.

Products 
Safterei produces four kinds of different juices for the every day consumption:

Querbeet: This dark red juice gets its color and flavor from the following main ingredients: Carrot, Beetroot, Apple, Pear and Parsnip.
Wilderübe: This bright orange juice owes its natural color from the main ingredients such as: Carrot, Mango, Parsnip, Apple and Pear.
Täglichgrün: This juice mostly contains green fruits and vegetables, giving it his unique green color. The main ingredients are: Spinach, Cucumber, Apple, Mango and Ginger.
Beerenstark: This juice has a bright and fruity color because it is the only one that contains only fruits such as: Apple, Strawberry, Raspberry and Blackberry

References

External links
 

Vegetable juice
Food and drink companies based in Berlin
Manufacturing companies based in Berlin
Companies established in 2014
Juice brands